Garneddwen Halt in Merioneth (now Gwynedd), Wales, was formerly a station at the summit of the Great Western Railway Ruabon to Barmouth line. It closed to passengers on Monday 18 January 1965.

This should not be confused with Garneddwen Station on the narrow-gauge Corris Railway.

The station had two short staggered platforms with a passing loop and signal box. The station could only be accessed by a path from the Bala to Dolgellau road.
Both platforms are still extant on farmland and can be seen from the A494.

Neighbouring stations

References

Further reading

External links
 Garneddwen Halt on navigable 1953 O. S. map

Disused railway stations in Gwynedd
Beeching closures in Wales
Railway stations in Great Britain opened in 1928
Railway stations in Great Britain closed in 1965
Llanuwchllyn
Former Great Western Railway stations